The Colombia national badminton team represents Colombia in international badminton team competitions. The national team is controlled and administered by the Bádminton Colombia, the governing body for Colombian badminton located in the capital city of Medellín. The Colombian men's and women's team debuted in the Pan American Badminton Championships in 2010.

The mixed team competed in the 2019 Pan Am Badminton Championships. They were eliminated in the group stages and finished in 9th place on the classification ranking.

Participation in Pan American Badminton Championships

Men's team

Women's team

Mixed team

Participation in South American Games 
The Colombian team competed in the South American Games. Colombia hosted the 2010 South American Games. The team was placed in Group A with Peru and Argentina. The team lost both ties and were eliminated in the group stages.

Current squad
The following players were selected to represent Colombia at the 2019 Pan Am Badminton Championships.

Male players
Fabian Ardila
Jhon Berdugo
Barrientos Mateo
Juan Noguera

Female players
Juliana Giraldo
Laura Valentina Londono
Luisa Valerio

References

Badminton
National badminton teams
Badminton in Colombia